RTP África is a Portuguese television channel owned and operated by state-owned public broadcaster Rádio e Televisão de Portugal (RTP). It is available in the Portuguese-speaking African countries, where it is available as a basic cable and satellite channel, with the exception of Cabo Verde, where it is available as a free-to-air channel, distributed by the country's digital terrestrial television network. RTP África is also available for free on RTP's platform RTP Play.

Its programming comes from the Portuguese public and private television channels and African public networks, RTP África also airs its own news, food and music TV shows. The channel is especially developed for the African communities and the cultural interchange between them and Portugal and for the Portuguese populations of Lusophone Africa. Due to a protocol, the channel also transmits programs from the United Nations dubbed in Portuguese.

The channels' primetime news program, Repórter África, focus on independent daily news for the five African countries, often the only independent news source in these countries and it has been criticised by some regimes, namely São Tomé and Príncipe and the former regime of Guinea-Bissau, in the latter the channel was put off air for some weeks due to its "uncontrolled" news broadcasts although currently there are no problems. Fórum Africa is a weekly interview program produced between the five African delegations of RTP.

Música d'África transmitting from Mozambique is the channel's music show with African music videoclips and reports. Local music shows are also broadcast Massave from Mozambique and Top Crioulo from Cape Verde. Artes e Espéctáculos the arts show of the channel transmitting from Cape Verde and Latitudes is a cultural program issuing the African immigrant communities in Portugal.

The channel also transmits Portuguese-language soap operas, films, series, documentaries and African entertainment shows. In Africa the channel is best known for the Portuguese Liga broadcasts, given the fact that in these countries most football fans are supporters of Benfica, Sporting or Porto. The channel also gained fame for its São Tomean (Na Roça com os Tachos, international title: The Cooking of the Enchanted Islands) and Angolan  (Moamba) cuisine shows.

External links
 Official Site 
 RTP África Live Stream on RTP Play

Portuguese-language television stations
Television networks in Portugal
International broadcasters
Television channels and stations established in 1998
Television stations in Angola
Television stations in Cape Verde
Television stations in Guinea-Bissau
Television channels in Mozambique
Television stations in Portugal
Television stations in São Tomé and Príncipe
1998 establishments in Portugal
Rádio e Televisão de Portugal